Wild Cat is the eighth studio album by Canadian hard rock band, Danko Jones. The album was released on 3 March 2017 through AFM Records.

Background 
On December 14, 2016, it was revealed that the title of the 8th Danko Jones album would be Wild Cat, and that it will be released on March 3, 2017. The band also announced a 17-date European tour to accompany the release of the album.

2017 saw four more tours: a spring Canadian tour, the usual summer festival tour, an autumn Canadian tour and a winter Nordic tour. On February 1, 2018, it was announced they'd be supporting Skindred on their April UK tour, alongside CKY. In May, they announced another European tour scheduled for November/December.

Critical reception 

Wild Cat was well-received by most contemporary music critics. On review aggregator website, Metacritic, which normalizes music ratings, Wildcat received an average score of 74 out of 100, indicating "generally favorable reviews based on four critics".

Track listing

Personnel 
The following individuals were credited with the production of the album.
 Band
 John Calabrese — Bass
 Danko Jones — Guitar, Primary Artist, Vocals
 Rich Knox — Drums
 Production
 Andrew Doidge — Assistant Engineer
Harry Hess — Mastering, Vocals
 Ryan Jones — Digital Engineer, Engineer
 Kenny Luong — Digital Engineer
 Vespa Justin Madill — Assistant Engineer
 Craig Pattison — Guitar Technician
 Eric Ratz — Engineer, Mixing, Producer
 Luke Schindler — Assistant Engineer
 Jeff Zurba — Drum Technician

References

External links 
 
 Wild Cat at Genius
 

2017 albums
Danko Jones albums
AFM Records albums